Julie Esmeralda Lima Pérez is a Venezuelan actress known for her roles in telenovelas. She was born in Caracas on 19 November 1981.

She was previously married to actor Jonathan Montenegro with whom they participated in the telenovela Juana la virgen. They have a daughter together who is called Antonella Alessandra Montenegro Lima

Filmography

Telenovelas
 Para verte mejor (2016)
 Corazón Esmeralda (2014) - Vanessa Villamizar
 Dulce Amargo (2012)- María Gabriela Montes "La Maga"
 Natalia del Mar (2011) - Perla Uzcátegui Lopéz"
 Libres como el viento (2009) - Tibisay Pacheco Camaleona (2007) - Natalia Ruíz Te Tengo en Salsa (2006) - Patricia Palacios Amor a Palos (2005) - Rocío Vargas La Cuaima (2003) - Daysi Chacón Juana la virgen (2002) - Brandy La Soberana (2001) - Petra''
 Viva la Pepa (2001)
 Hay Amores Que Matan (2000)
 La calle de los sueños (1999)

Film
 Er conde jones (2012)

References

External links

Entrevista a Juliet Lima at 

Living people
1981 births
Actresses from Caracas
Venezuelan telenovela actresses